Carranglan, officially the Municipality of Carranglan, is a 1st class municipality in the province of Nueva Ecija, Philippines. According to the 2020 census, it has a population of 42,420 people.

The municipality is home to the Pantabangan–Carranglan Watershed Forest Reserve.

History

Geography
It is the province's largest municipality in terms of land area.

Barangays
Carranglan is politically subdivided into 17 barangays.

Climate

Demographics

Economy

Tourism
Saint Nicolas of Tolentine Parish Church of Carranglan
Carranglan Central School
Carranglan Municipal Hall

Gallery

References

External links

 [ Philippine Standard Geographic Code]
Philippine Census Information
Local Governance Performance Management System

Municipalities of Nueva Ecija